Riverside Unified School District (a.k.a. RUSD) is a school district headquartered in Riverside, California, United States.  The district serves a large portion of Riverside as well as unincorporated areas of Highgrove and Woodcrest in Riverside County.

Elementary schools 

 Adams
 Alcott
 Patricia Beatty
 Bryant
 Castle View
 Emerson
 Benjamin Franklin
 Fremont
 Benjamin Harrison
 Hawthorne
 Highgrove
 Highland
 Jackson
 Jefferson
 John F. Kennedy
 Lake Mathews
 Liberty
 Longfellow
 Madison
 Magnolia
 Mark Twain
 Monroe
 Mountain View
 Pachappa
 Tomas Rivera
 Sunshine
 William H. Taft
 Victoria
 Washington
 Woodcrest
 Riverside STEM Academy (5th through 12th)

Middle schools 
 Central
 Chemawa
 Amelia Earhart
 Frank Augustus Miller Middle School
 Matthew Gage
 Sierra
 University Heights
 Riverside STEM Academy (5th through 12th)

High schools 
 Abraham Lincoln (Continuation)
 Arlington
North
 Martin Luther King (King)
 Raincross (EOC)
 Ramona 
 Riverside Polytechnic (Poly)
 Summit View (EOC)
 Riverside STEM Academy

Virtual schools 
 Riverside Virtual School (1st through 12th)(EOC)

Adult schools 
 Project TEAM
 Riverside Adult School

References

External links
 

Education in Riverside, California
School districts in Riverside County, California